Praseodymium(IV) oxide is an inorganic compound with chemical formula PrO2.

Production 
Praseodymium(IV) oxide can be produced by boiling Pr6O11 in water or acetic acid:
 Pr6O11 + 3 H2O → 4 PrO2 + 2 Pr(OH)3

Chemical reactions
Praseodymium(IV) oxide starts to decompose at 320~360 °C, liberating oxygen.

References 

Praseodymium compounds
Oxides